U19 or U-19 may refer to:

 German submarine U-19, one of several German submarines
 U-19A or U-19B, later-day model designations for the Stinson L-5 Sentinel aircraft
  U-19, U19, or U 19, an abbreviation of "under 19", a common designation for sports leagues or tournaments for players age 19 or younger 
 Specifically, one of several Under-19 association football teams
 For the U19 Bandy World Championship, see Bandy World Championship Y-19
 U-19 An experimental self-propelled gun armed with 203mm B-4 cannon based on the KV-1 tank.